Lake Lenore may refer to:

Rural Municipality of Lake Lenore No. 399, a rural municipality in Saskatchewan, Canada
Lake Lenore, Saskatchewan, a village in Saskatchewan, Canada
Lake Lenore (Washington), a lake in the state of Washington in the United States

See also
Lenore Lake, a lake in Saskatchewan, Canada